Salisbury Township is a township in Lehigh County, Pennsylvania. The township's population was 13,505 at the 2010 census. The township borders Allentown (Pennsylvania's third largest city), Bethlehem, and Emmaus, in the Lehigh Valley, which had a population of 861,899 and was the 68th most populous metropolitan area in the U.S. as of the 2020 census.

South Mall, an enclosed shopping mall, is located on Lehigh Street in the township.

Demographics

As of the census of 2010, there were 13,505 people, 5,595 households, and 3,832 families residing in the township.  The population density was 1,224.9 people per square mile (472.9/km2).  There were 5,595 housing units at an average density of 495.1 per square mile (191.0/km2).  The racial makeup of the township was 91.39% White, 2.93% African American, 0.03% Native American, 1.60 Asian, 0.02% Pacific Islander, 2.40% from other races, and 1.63% from two or more races. Hispanic or Latino of any race were 2.14% of the population.

There were 5,333 households, out of which 24.79% had children under the age of 18 living with them, 60.25% were married couples living together, 7.61% had a female householder with no husband present, and 28.15% were non-families. 23.53% of all households were made up of individuals, and 12.11% had someone living alone who was 65 years of age or older.  The average household size was 2.47 and the average family size was 2.91.

In the township, the population was spread out, with 18.84% under the age of 18, 7.02% from 18 to 24, 21.22% from 25 to 44, 32.90% from 45 to 64, and 20.01% who were 65 years of age or older.  The median age was 48.2 years. For every 100 females, there were 99.1 males.  For every 100 females age 18 and over, there were 96.5 males. The estimated median income for a household in the township in 2014 was $69,685, and the estimated median income for a family was $84,429. Males had an estimated median income of $54,869 versus $39,024 for females. The estimated per capita income for the township was $35,133.  In 2014 it was estimated that 4.1% of families and 5.8% of the population were below the poverty line, including 8.0% of those under age 18 and 5.5% of those age 65 or over.

Geography

It is drained by the Lehigh River, which separates it from Bethlehem and the east side of Allentown, and borders Upper Saucon Township on South Mountain.

Emmaus and Allentown share a border, separating Salisbury into two demographically distinct non-contiguous portions. The township's villages of Farmington, Gauff Hill and Summit Lawn are in the eastern portion. The CDP of Dorneyville is in both the extreme northwestern part of the township and in South Whitehall Township.

Climate
Salisbury Township has a hot-summer humid continental climate (Dfa) and is in hardiness zone 6b.

Adjacent municipalities
Fountain Hill (northeast)
Bethlehem (northeast)
Allentown (north and northwest)
South Whitehall Township (west)
Lower Macungie Township (southwest)
Emmaus (south)
Upper Milford Township (south)
Upper Saucon Township (southeast)
Lower Saucon Township, Northampton County (east)

Education

The township is served by the Salisbury Township School District. Salisbury High School serves grades 9 through 12.

Notable people
Ian Riccaboni, Ring of Honor commentator

Transportation

Salisbury's major thoroughfares include Interstate 78/Pennsylvania Route 309, Pennsylvania Route 29, Pennsylvania Route 145 (Pike Avenue,) Emmaus Avenue, Susquehanna Street/Broadway, Lehigh Street, 24th Street, and Cedar Crest Boulevard. The township is served by multiple LANta bus routes.

Gallery

References

External links

Townships in Lehigh County, Pennsylvania
Townships in Pennsylvania